Aslak Bolt's cadastre (written 1432–1433) is a Norwegian cadastre, a detailed register of properties and incomes of the Archdiocese of Nidaros.

History
Aslak Bolt's cadastre was a register of land ownership with the Archdiocese of Nidaros. The cadastre comprises more than 3000 farms, with information about scope and volume of income.
The document is originally written on the instruction of archbishop Aslak Bolt (c. 1380 – 1450), Archbishop of the  Diocese of Nidaros. It was probably completed in 1432 and 1433, with later supplements and corrections. The properties of the archdiocese included several thousand farms. The records in the land register are arranged topographically by counties within the diocese.  The cadastre is regarded as an important primary historical source, both for historical economic research, and for research of place names.

The original document was written on pergament and is now deposited at the National Archives of Norway  (Riksarkivet).
The information contained in the cadastre was published by historian Peter Andreas Munch  (1810 – 1863) in 1852. It was later published in 1997 by the National Archives of Norway.

References

Related reading
Jørgensen, Jon Gunnar (1997) Aslak Bolts jordebok	 (Oslo : Riksarkivet) 
Medieval documents
15th-century documents
Documents of the Catholic Church
Christianity in medieval Norway
1432 in Europe
15th century in Norway
Norwegian books
1852 books
15th-century Catholicism
Medieval documents of Norway